Mitacs is a nonprofit national research organization that, in partnerships with Canadian academia, private industry and government, operates research and training programs in fields related to industrial and social innovation.

History
Mitacs was founded by Canadian mathematicians in 1999. The organization, whose name originally stood for "Mathematics of Information Technology and Complex Systems", worked in the field of mathematical sciences and associated disciplines but has since expanded. In 2004, the Mitacs Accelerate program was launched and has since supported over 10,000 internships nationally.
https://www.ams.org/journals/notices/201908/rnoti-p1290.pdf

Programs
As of late 2020, Mitacs operates six main programs:

Accelerate 

The organization's flagship program has supported over 10,000 research internships for graduate students and postdoctoral fellows since 2004 and has since replaced the Natural Sciences and Engineering Research Council's Industrial Postgraduate Scholarships Program.

Elevate 

The two-year program has the objective of providing postdoctoral fellows with professional and leadership development training while leading a long-term research project with a partner organization.

Globalink 

The international program supports two-way research collaboration between Canada and research partners abroad. In 2016, the Globalink Research Internship program welcomed 565 students across Canada.

Canadian Science Policy Fellowship 

The program matches PhD-level researchers to government agencies to influence evidence-based policy-making.

Entrepreneur International 

The program offers travel grants to Canadian start-ups housed in university-linked incubators. The grant enables start-ups to connect with international incubators.

Business Strategy Internship 

The program provides funding to students who develop innovative projects designed to help Canadian businesses.

Awards
Mitacs presents annual awards in seven categories:
 Alejandro Adem Legacy Award for Outstanding Innovation — Indigenous
 Mitacs Award for Outstanding Innovation — International
 Mitacs Award for Outstanding Innovation — Master's
 Award for Outstanding Innovation — PhD
 Mitacs Award for Outstanding Innovation — Postdoctoral
 Mitacs Award for Exceptional Leadership — Professor
 Mitacs & NRC–IRAP Award for Commercialization

Funding
Mitacs is jointly funded by the federal and provincial Canadian governments, academic partners and research partners. Between 2006 and 2015, the organization received $128 million in investments from the federal government. In 2015, the federal government pledged $56.4 million over four years (starting in 2016) to Mitacs in support of graduate-level research and development internships.

References

External links 
Official website

Funding bodies of Canada
Scientific organizations based in Canada
Higher education in Canada
1999 establishments in Canada